Luigi Galleani (August 12, 1861 – November 4, 1931) was an Italian insurrectionary anarchist best known for his advocacy of "propaganda of the deed", a strategy of political assassinations and violent attacks. 

Born in Vercelli, he became a leading figure in the Piedmont labor movement, for which he was sentenced to exile on the island of Pantelleria. In 1901, he fled to the United States and he joined the Italian immigrant workers movement in Paterson, New Jersey. He subsequently moved to Vermont and Massachusetts, where he launched the radical newspaper Cronaca Sovversiva. He gained many dedicated followers among Italian American anarchists, known as the Galleanisti, who carried out a series of bombing attacks throughout the United States. 

For his involvement in the anti-war movement during World War I, Galleani was deported back to Italy, where he was subjected to political repression following the rise of Fascism. During the final years of his life, he published The End of Anarchism?, a defense of anarcho-communism from criticisms by reformist socialists. Galleani rejected reformism, in favor of "continuous attack" against institutions of capitalism and the state, and even opposed any form of formal organization, which he saw as inherently corrupting and hierarchical.

Biography

Early life
On August 12, 1861, Luigi Galleani was born into a middle-class family, in the Piedmontese city of Vercelli. He first became interested in anarchism while studying law at the University of Turin, eventually renouncing law in favour of anarchist propaganda against capitalism and the state. Galleani's skill in oratory and writing quickly made him a leading voice in the new generation of the Italian anarchist movement. Alongside Pietro Gori, he led a resurgence of militant anarchist activism, which gained a large following among the workers of Northern Italy.

Labor movement activism
By the mid-1880s, the anarchists had already lost ground to the Italian Workers' Party (POI), which developed a large support base among northern workers. The anarchists were initially skeptical of the POI, due to the latter's tendencies towards workerism and reformism, but relations between the two became more cordial over time. In 1887, Galleani spearheaded the Piedmontese anarchist movement's reorientation towards the labor movement and its rapprochment with the POI. That year, he established the Turin-based newspaper Gazzetta Operaia, formed a number of workers' organizations in Vercelli and distributed revolutionary propaganda among the factory workers of Biella. In 1888, he went on a lecture tour in towns throughout Piedmont and led a series of strike actions by Piedmontese workers in both Turin and Vercelli, increasing support for the anarchist movement and the POI. 

However, relations between the anarchists and the POI were again worsening, due to the latter's continued participation in local elections. Nevertheless, Galleani continued to pursue the anarchist infiltration of the POI, in order to attempt to bring it towards revolutionary socialism. He continued to advocate for a conciliatory approach between the reformists and revolutionaries, resulting in the POI both continuing its electoral participation while also endorsing class conflict. Although Galleani prevented a formal split from occuring, the two factions were ultimately irreconciable and Galleani's attempts to transform the POI proved unsuccessful.

When Galleani's radical activism threatened him with arrest, in 1889, he fled to France then to Switzerland, where he collaborated with Elisee Reclus in the preparation of his Nouvelle Geographie Universalle and organised a students' demonstration at the University of Geneva, in honour of the Haymarket martyrs. Galleani was also scheduled to attend the Italian anarchist movement's Capolago congress, but en route to the congress from Geneva, he was arrested by the Swiss authorities and expelled back to Italy. Back in Italy, Galleani immediately continued his radical activities, embarking on a speaking tour of Tuscany, with the aim of fomenting an uprising on International Workers' Day of 1891.

In 1892, together with Pietro Gori and Giovanni Domanico, Galleani was delegated to represent the anarchists at the Genoa Workers' Congress, with the intention of obstructing the motions of the dominant reformist faction. In opposition to the social democrats, led by Filippo Turati, an alliance was formed by the anarchists and the workerists, who both opposed political participation. On August 14, a fierce argument broke out between the anarchist and socialist delegates, leading to two separate meetings being convened the following day. Having finally forced the anarchists to split from the movement, Turati's social democratic majority established the new Italian Socialist Party (PSI), despite the objections of Galleani and his fellow delegates, whose own attempts at forming an anarchist party were stillborn. The congress proved that Galleani's agitational campaign had ultimately failed to gain a mass following among the workers, leading to many Italian anarchists becoming dissilusioned with the labor movement, which came under the direction of the PSI.

Exile
In the wake of the Fatti di Maggio, the Italian government launched a new campaign of political repression against the anarchist movement, arresting anarchists en masse and internally exiling them to small islands for up to five years, all without a trial. Galleani himself was swiftly arrested, convicted for conspiracy, and exiled to the Sicilian island of Pantelleria. There he met and married Maria, who already had a young son, Salvatore. Luigi and Maria Galleani eventually had four children of their own.

With Elisee Reclus's aid, Galleani managed escape from Italy to Egypt, where he stayed with other Italian immigrants for a year. When he was threatened with extradition back to Italy, he fled to the United States, arriving in October 1901, shortly after the assassination of William McKinley.

Life in the United States
Galleani settled in Paterson, New Jersey, a hub for Piedmontese immigrant silk weavers and dyers, where he took up editing the Italian anarchist newspaper La Questione Sociale. When a silk workers' strike broke out in the city in June 1902, Galleani became a vocal supporter, giving a series of speeches in which he called for a revolutionary general strike to overthrow capitalism. When the striking workers clashed with police, Galleani was shot in the face and charged for incitement to riot. 

He escaped to Canada and recovered from his wounds, before covertly returning over the border and hiding out in Barre, Vermont, where he stayed with Tuscan stonemasons from Carrara. With these new comrades, in June 6, 1903, Galleani launched a Cronaca Sovversiva, which rapidly became the most influential Italian anarchist periodical in North America, receiving worldwide distribution. Through this new publication, in 1905, Galleani published the bomb-making manual La Salute è in voi!, in which he supplied to his readers the chemical formula for making nitroglycerine, compiled by a friend and explosives expert, Professor Ettore Molinari.

In 1906, the editor of the rival Italian socialist newspaper Il Proletario publicised Galleani's location and he was quickly located by authorities. Arrested, he was brought back to Paterson and tried for incitement, although a hung jury resulted in him being released. He returned to Barre, where he once again resumed giving fiery speeches and writing hundreds of articles for his newspaper, quickly becoming a leading voice in the Italian American anarchist movement. In late 1907, in response to Francesco Saverio Merlino's public renunciation of anarchism in favour of reformist labor unionism, Galleani published a series of articles in defense of anarchism. By this time, Galleani become dissilusioned with the labor movement and came to reject labor unions entirely, instead adopting an anti-organizational form of anarchism, which became the dominant tendency within the Italian American anarchist movement. Galleani even openly broke with the anarcho-syndicalist Carlo Tresca over the latter's cooperation with the Industrial Workers of the World, causing a rift between their followers that undermined the Italian American anarchist movement's cohesion.

Galleani gained many militant and highly-devoted followers, known as the Galleanisti, who likewise rejected all formal organization and developed markedly extremist tendencies. These disciples included Nicola Sacco and
Bartolomeo Vanzetti, who promoted Galleani's lectures and distributed his literature. The Galleanisti, following Galleani's anti-organizational principles, formed small, tight-knit cells made up of "self-selecting individuals". Although they rejected formal leadership, Galleani himself was treated with reverence and he had the status of an unofficial leader.

Deportation and death
Following the American entry into World War I, Galleani became a leading voice in the anti-war movement, declaring that the anarchist movement was "Against the War, Against the Peace, For Social Revolution!" In response to the passage of the Selective Service Act of 1917, Galleani urged his followers to refuse registration and go into hiding, with Galleani himself and many of his comrades moving to a cabin in the woods near Taunton, Massachusetts. At his direction, Galleanisti escaped to Mexico, from which they planned to return to Italy, where they believed a revolution was imminent. Despite the ongoing Mexican Revolution, Galleani had rejected the possibility of an anarchist revolution in Mexico itself, due to its high population of people of color, whom he characterized as "uninterested" racial groups.

This made him a target for political repression by the American government. On June 17, 1917, federal agents raided the offices of the Cronaca Sovversiva in Lynn, Massachusetts, arresting Galleani and shutting down the newspaper. Charged with conspiracy, Galleani and eight of his followers were subsequently deported back to Italy, leaving his family behind in the United States, on June 24, 1919.

He attempted to continue publishing Cronaca Sovversiva upon arrival in Turin, but it was quickly suppressed by the Italian authorities. In the wake of the March on Rome in 1922, Galleani was arrested and convicted of sedition by the new fascist authorities, which sentenced him to 14 months in prison. After being released, Galleani concluded his polemic against Merlino, writing a further series of articles and publishing them together in 1925 as the book The End of Anarchism?. While the book was hailed by Errico Malatesta as a key text in anarcho-communism, in November 1926, it provoked his arrest by the fascist authorities, on charges of insulting Benito Mussolini. He spent time in the cell he had been kept in for months in 1892, before being banished to Lipari and later Messina, where he was imprisoned for 6 months.

In February 1930, Galleani was granted compassionate release due to his failing health. After returning from a walk through the countryside, during which he was followed by the police, Galleani collapsed from a heart attack, dying on November 4, 1931.

Political ideology
Galleani's conception of anarcho-communism combined the insurrectionary anarchism expounded by Max Stirner with the mutual aid advocated by Peter Kropotkin. He defended the principles of revolutionary spontaneity, autonomy, diversity, self-determination and direct action, and advocated for the violent overthrow of the state and capitalism through propaganda of the deed. 

Galleani rejected all forms of formal organization, including anarchist federations and labor unions, and opposed participating in the labor movement, as he believed it was inherently reformist and susceptible to corruption. From his rejection of reformism, Galleani concluded that social change could only be brought about through violent attacks against institutions, which he believed could build towards a popular insurrection. As such, he publicly endorsed terrorism, or what he called "propaganda of the deed", which came in the form of the assassination of authority figures and the expropriation of private property. He defended both the assassination of William McKinley by Leon Czolgosz and the assassination of Umberto I of Italy by Gaetano Bresci.

In his own words, Galleani's ultimate aim was to establish "a society without masters, without government, without law, without any coercive control—a society functioning on the basis of mutual agreement and allowing each member the freedom to enjoy absolute autonomy." But he also rejected prefigurative politics, such as that advocated by anarcho-syndicalists, as he believed that people themselves would instinctively understand how to live as a free and equal society once the state and capitalism were overthrown.

Legacy

In retaliation for Galleani's deportation from the United States, the Galleanisti launched a campaign of terrorist attacks, carrying out a series of bombings in 1919. In the political repression that followed, many of the Galleanisti were arrested, including Nicola Sacco and Bartolomeo Vanzetti, who were sentenced to death despite the lack of evidence against them. In reprisal, the Galleanist Mario Buda was alleged to have carried out the Wall Street bombing of 1920, which killed 33 people.

During the 1930s, the Romanian American anarchist Marcus Graham attempted to revive the Galleanist movement with the San Francisco-based newspaper Man!, but its efforts were unsuccessful and the paper was shut down in 1939.

By the time of the defeat of Italian Fascism in World War II, the Italian American anarchist movement had largely dissipated. The Galleanist L'Adunata dei Refrattari continued publication until 1971, when it was succeeded by the anti-authoritarian periodical Fifth Estate.
 
By the late-20th century, Galleani's figure fell into obscurity, receiving relatively little research from scholars. It was only in 1982, when The End of Anarchism? received an English language translation, that interest in Galleani again began to grow. In 2006, more English translations of Galleani's work were published in a compilation by AK Press.

Selected works

See also
 First Red Scare
 L' Adunata dei refrattari

References

Bibliography

Further reading

External links
 
text of the Plain Words flier found at the June 1919 bombings
Luigi Galleani, from the Anarchist Encyclopedia
9/16/20: Terrorists Bomb Wall Street
GALLEANI, The End of Anarchism ?
Anarchy Will Be!: Selected Writings Of Luigi Galleani
"The Principal of Organization to the Light of Anarchism" 

1861 births
1931 deaths
American anarchists
American anti–World War I activists
Anarchist theorists
Anarcho-communists
Galleanisti
Insurrectionary anarchists
Italian anarchists
Italian anti-capitalists
Italian anti-fascists
Italian atheists
Italian communists
Italian emigrants to the United States
Italian newspaper editors
Italian revolutionaries
People deported from the United States
People from Vercelli
Publishers (people) of Italian-language newspapers in the United States